The Cornish Hush Mine was a British lead ore and fluorspar mine in Weardale.

Location  
The mine was located in the Howden Burn valley in the Bollihope Area of Weardale in the North Pennines, County Durham, England.

History 
The mine operated from at least 1863 to 1902 to mine lead ore and from 1971 to 1972 and from 1979 to 1980 to mine fluorspar .

Lead mining  
One of the first publications about the Cornish Hush Mine described a fatal accident, in which miner John Collinson was buried underneath a large amount of rocks and lead ore falling onto him during his work and him killed immediately on 14 January 1863. A colleague named Bainbridge had worked with him about two minutes earlier and then moved about 6 foot (1.5 m) away to smoke his pipe as the stones fell onto Collinson. The stones were removed from him in a short time, but he was already dead by then.

The London Lead Company leased the so-called Cornish Mine in 1867 by the dean and chapter of Durham Cathedral. It was managed by R. W. Bainbridge, whose son, Henry Bainbridge, also worked there. All the work to clean and concentrate the ore was done by machines in a water based process, which were operated by adolescents under the supervision of an adult.

On 27 July 1867, the Salmon Fishery Inspectors reported that they had visited several lead mines, where they inspected the hush, i.e. the waste water of the processing plant. There were three large tanks, each with several division into separate compartments, to clear the hush of impurities. Large sediment basins had been installed around 1863 side by side next to these tanks, through which the water flowed, set-up on the proposal of the Fisheries Commission in Darlington.

The mine employed 1898, at its height, 14 men, twelve of whom worked underground and two on the surface.  The last agent of the Cornish Hush Mine was Joseph Anderson, and its last manager was Mr. Willis, before the London Lead Company went bankrupt in 1902.

Fluorspar mining 
Various crystals were mined as a valuable by-product of lead mining, including the decorative colored fluorspar (fluorite), for which no industrial use was known until the late 19th century. Fluorite is not a gem, but fine specimens are appreciated by collectors. The Weardale fluorspar fluoresces due to europium impurities under excitation with bluish-ultraviolet light. The characteristic fluorescence of fluorite samples from this area resulted in the term describing this phenomenon. Weardale fluorspar is considered by collectors to be one of the best and therefore most valuable in the world. In the 20th century, fluorite was increasingly used industrially for steel smelting as well as for the production of Teflon non-stick frying pans, CFCs for aerosols and other products.
 
The Swiss Aluminum Mining UK Ltd (SAMUK) recommissioned the Cornish Hush Mine 1971–1972 and 1979–1980 with the aim to mine fluorspar in the Cornish Hush Vein and the Sharnberry Vein, but the latter was never reached.

Narrow gauge railway

The mine's steam locomotive Samson was built by Stephen Lewin of Poole in Dorset in 1874 as an  steam locomotive. It had power of 2½ or 3 nhp and a loaded weight of 2.6 t. Its footplate provided just enough space for the engineer, who could sit on the rear buffer beam, as known from its even smaller sister locomotives 'Ant' and 'Bee' of the Great Laxey Mine. The locomotive was probably scrapped around 1904.

The locomotive of the mine was built by Stephen Lewin of Poole in Dorset in 1874 as a two-axle steam locomotive named 'Samson' with a left-side gear drive. The gears on the left wheels of the locomotive came neither in touch with the rail nor with a rack. The rear axle was driven crankshaft above of the boiler, which had a pinion on the left hand side underneath a protective cover with and a flywheel on the right hand side. The front axle, which was coupled to the rear axle by a connecting rod, did not actually need a gear, but had one, so that the front and rear axles could be exchanged or replaced with the same spare part when the gear was worn.
 
The locomotive had a gauge of only 22 inches (559 mm), a power of 2½ or 3 nhp and a service weight of 2.6 t. It was similar to its even smaller sister locomotives 'Ant' and 'Bee' from the Great Laxey Mine Railway, as the foot plate provided only space for the engine driver, who commonly sat on the rear buffer beam. 'Samson' was probably scrapped around 1904.

The Beamish Museum built a replica of the full-size locomotive, which has, however, slightly larger wheels and a 2-foot (610 mm) gauge. It was successfully steamed-up on 12 January 2016 and subsequently put into regular use.

References

External links 
 Paul Rodrigues: Weardale - Cornish Hush Area (29 photos of the mine on Flickr).
 Paul Jarman und Roy Link (Hrsg.): The Book of Samson… RCL Publications, 2016.

Mines in County Durham
Transport in the United Kingdom
Surface mines in England
1882 establishments in England
1 ft 10 in gauge railways
Stanhope, County Durham
Lead mines in England
Fluorite mines